Sivrihisar ("a pointed castle") is a town and district of Eskişehir Province in the Central Anatolia Region of Turkey. According to 2010 census, population of the district is 23 488 of which 9,817 live in the town of Sivrihisar.

Location
It is located at the intersection of the E-90 and E-96 routes.

Economy

As of 1920, Sivrihisar was producing knitting clothing.

Notable natives
Moushegh Ishkhan an Armenian genocide survivor, poet, writer and educator.
Nasreddin Hoca was born in Hortu village of Sivrihisar.
Yunus Emre was born in Sivrihisar.

See also
Monument of Sivrihisar Airplane
Sivrihisar Grand Mosque
Sivrihisar Aviation Center
M.S.Ö. Air & Space Museum

Notes

References

External links

 District governor's official website 
 Local guide to Sivrihisar 

Towns in Turkey
Populated places in Eskişehir Province
Districts of Eskişehir Province
Phrygia